Sărățel may refer to the following places in Romania:

 Sărățel, a village in Șieu-Măgheruș Commune, Bistrița-Năsăud County
 Sărățel, a village in Predeal-Sărari Commune, Prahova County
 Sărățel (Râmnicul Sărat), a tributary of the river Râmnicul Sărat in Vrancea County
 Sărățel (Buzău), a tributary of the river Buzău in Buzău County

See also 
 Sarata (disambiguation)
 Sărăteni (disambiguation)
 Sărulești (disambiguation)